My Melody may refer to:

 My Melody, a fictional character created by Sanrio
 My Melody (Queen Pen album), 1997
 My Melody (Stereo Total album), 1999
 My Melody (Deniece Williams album), 1981
 "My Melody", a 1987 song by Eric B. & Rakim from Paid in Full
"My Melody", a 2017 song by Loona from YeoJin

See also 

 Onegai My Melody, a 2005 Japanese anime series based on the Sanrio character